Ernesto Contreras (1915–2003) served as a Mexican medical doctor. He operated the Oasis of Hope Hospital in Tijuana for over 30 years, claiming to "treat" cancer patients with amygdalin (also called "laetrile" or, erroneously, "vitamin B17") which has been found completely ineffective. His practices have been widely condemned.

Contreras received post-graduate training at the Children's Hospital Boston in Boston. He served as the chief pathologist at the Army Hospital in Mexico City and was Professor of Histology and Pathology at the Mexican Army Medical School.

Controversial cancer treatment
About extreme terminal cancer cases, Contreras alleged: "The palliative action [the ability of laetrile to improve comfort of patient] is in about 60% of the cases. Frequently, enough to be significant, I see arrest of the disease or even regression in some 15% of the very advanced cases." There is no evidence to support Contreras' statements.

Many of Contreras' patients came from the United States, where use of laetrile is not approved by the Food and Drug Administration.  Since the 1970s, the use of Laetrile to treat cancer has been described in the scientific literature as a canonical example of quackery and has never been shown to be effective in the treatment or prevention of cancer.

See also
List of ineffective cancer treatments

References

External links
 Oasis of Hope Hospital - Biography of Ernesto Contreras.

1915 births
2003 deaths
Harvard Medical School people
Mexican pathologists
Mexican military doctors
Mexican oncologists
20th-century Mexican military personnel
20th-century Mexican physicians